Douglas Clyde Macintosh (1877–1948) was a Canadian theologian.

Biography
Macintosh was born in Breadalbane, Ontario, on 18 February 1877 and received his undergraduate degree from McMaster University when it was in Toronto. In 1907 was ordained a Baptist minister and taught at Brandon College in Manitoba. In 1909 Macintosh received his Doctor of Philosophy degree from the University of Chicago and joined Yale Divinity School, becoming an assistant professor of systematic theology.

During the First World War he volunteered for the Canadian Army and served at the front as a military chaplain.  He further oversaw an American YMCA hut in France until the armistice. In 1916 he was named the Dwight Professor of Theology and later served as the chairman of the Yale Religion Department from 1920 to 1938.

In 1921, he married Emily Pouell, who died in childbirth the following year. He subsequently married Hope Griswold Conklin in 1925, with whom he did not have children.

Macintosh is also notable for a 1931 Supreme Court of the United States case. In 1925 Macintosh petitioned to become a naturalized US citizen. At a hearing before the US District Court for the District of Connecticut Macintosh explained that the moral principles of Christianity would allow him to take the Oath of Allegiance with the understanding that he was only swearing to take up arms in what he believed was a just war. The district court refused to grant Macintosh citizenship. This rejection was then reversed by Judge Thomas Walter Swan, a former Yale Law School Dean, on the US Court of Appeals for the Second Circuit. The government appealed, and before the Supreme Court the US Solicitor General Thomas D. Thacher, a Bonesman, appeared, while Macintosh was represented by Charles Edward Clark, a future Yale Law School Dean.

The sharply divided court rejected Macintosh's petition for citizenship. Writing for the court, Justice George Sutherland, joined by the other Four Horsemen, found that "We are a Christian people" but that "unqualified allegiance to the Nation and submission and obedience to the laws of the land, as well those made for war as those made for peace, are not inconsistent with the will of God."

Chief Justice Charles Evans Hughes dissented, joined by Justice Oliver Wendell Holmes Jr., Justice Louis Brandeis, and then Justice Harlan F. Stone. The dissenters traced Congress's long "happy tradition" of respecting conscientious objectors and wrote "The essence of religion is belief in a relation to God involving duties superior to those arising from any human relation."

A decade and a half later the Supreme Court would overturn itself, ruling 5–3 against the "arms-bearing pledge" in Girouard v. United States (1946). Macintosh alongside Henry Nelson Wieman, George Burman Foster, and Shailer Mathews is considered a shaper of "modernistic liberalism".

The First World War chaplain's chalice of former Yale University Dwight Professor of Theology Douglas Clyde Macintosh was given to the Yale Law School and accepted by Dean Harold Koh in September 2008 to honour the famous 1931 Supreme Court case, Macintosh v. United States, in which John W. Davis argued Macintosh's right to "selective conscientious objection" in Macintosh's application as a Canadian for US citizenship.

Macintosh's three-quarter-length portrait hangs in the common room of Yale Divinity School. It depicts him with his right hand toward a Bible opened to the commandment "Thou shalt have no other gods before me" and his left hand extended toward a bound volume of United States v. Macintosh, 1931. The portrait was painted in 1979 by New Haven artist Clarence Brodeur, past President of the Board of Trustees of the Fontainebleau Association, and editor  the Fontainebleau School Alumni Bulletin.

Works
 (1911)
 (1915), Macmillan
 (1919), Macmillan
 (1921) co-authored with George Burman Foster, Macmillan
 co-authored with Arthur Kenyon Rogers (1931), Macmillan
 (1937)
 (1939) Charles Scribner's Sons
 (1942) Charles Scribner's Sons

See also

 Hamilton v. Regents of the University of California
 Ideological restrictions on naturalization in U.S. law
 United States v. Schwimmer

References

Footnotes

Bibliography

Further reading

 
 

1877 births
1948 deaths
20th-century Canadian Baptist ministers
20th-century Canadian male writers
20th-century Canadian non-fiction writers
20th-century Protestant theologians
Academics in Ontario
Academic staff of Brandon University
Canadian Baptist theologians
Canadian expatriate academics in the United States
Canadian male non-fiction writers
Canadian people of Scottish descent
Conscientious objectors
McMaster University alumni
Systematic theologians
University of Chicago Divinity School alumni
Yale Divinity School faculty